Ralf Fücks (born 3 August 1951 in Edenkoben, Rhineland-Palatinate) is a German politician. He has been a member of the Green Party of Germany since 1982 and has been Mayor of Bremen.
He is a member of the Green European Foundation and Heinrich Böll Foundation. Since 2006 he is married to green politician Marieluise Beck, they have two daughters.

References

External links
Official site

1951 births
Living people
People from Edenkoben
Communist League of West Germany politicians
Alliance 90/The Greens politicians
Mayors of Bremen
Members of the Bürgerschaft of Bremen